Thota Tharani is an Indian film art director and production designer who has predominantly worked in Tamil, Telugu, and Malayalam cinema and Bollywood. As of 2013, he has won two National Film Awards, two Filmfare Awards South and four Tamil Nadu State Film Awards.  His work consists of paintings, murals, paper collages, wooden montages, and installations and so on.

Film career 
Thota Tharani has been involved in the art of set design since he was just twelve when he helped his father. His work in the films Nayakan and Indian earned him National Film Awards. His works include construction of a huge set replica of the Madurai Meenakshi Temple for the Telugu movie Arjun, Dasavathaaram, Kanthaswamy and Leader. He has worked in more than 100 feature films as a production designer, including three foreign productions: Pondichéry, dernier comptoir des Indes (French), Hanuman (French) and Branchie (Italian).

In addition to being an art director, Thota Tharani has worked as a Production designer and in the art department of various films.

Background 
Thota Tharani completed his Graduate Diploma in Mural Painting in 1971 and subsequently was offered a Fellowship from the Government of France to study print-making. Additionally, he completed print making courses from the Royal College of Art in London and New Delhi.

Awards 
Tiltles and honours
 2001 – Padma Shri
 2010 – Honorary doctorate (D.Litt) from Sathyabama University

National Film Award for Best Art Direction
 1987 – Nayakan
 1996 – Indian

Nandi Award for Best Art Director
 1983 – Sagara Sangamam
 1989 – Geethanjali
 2004 – Arjun

Kerala State Film Award for Best Art Director
 1991 – Abhimanyu

Tamil Nadu State Film Award for Best Art Director
 1991 – Thalapathi
 1994 – Kaadhalan
 2005 – Chandramukhi
 2007 – Sivaji, Sringaram

Vijay Award for Best Art Director
 2007 – Sivaji
 2008 – Dasavathaaram

Partial filmography

References

External links 
 

1949 births
Living people
Telugu people
Indian art directors
Recipients of the Padma Shri in arts
Filmfare Awards South winners
Indian production designers
Tamil Nadu State Film Awards winners
20th-century Indian designers
Artists from Chennai
21st-century Indian designers
Best Production Design National Film Award winners